Secret Squirrel is a cartoon character created by Hanna-Barbera and also the name of his segment in The Atom Ant/Secret Squirrel Show, which debuted in 1965. He was given his own show in 1966, titled The Secret Squirrel Show, but was reunited with Atom Ant for one more season in 1967. The half-hour The Secret Squirrel Show included three individual cartoon segments: "Secret Squirrel", "Squiddly Diddly" and "Winsome Witch". Secret Squirrel first appeared in a prime-time animated special called The World of Secret Squirrel and Atom Ant, which aired on NBC on September 12, 1965.

Secret Squirrel was a parody of the spy genre, and most of the shorts parodied elements of the James Bond films. Secret Squirrel was also known as "Agent 000". In 1993, 13 new Secret Squirrel cartoons appeared in-between the 2 Stupid Dogs first-season episodes, with the updated title Super Secret Secret Squirrel and a new cast.

Character profile
Secret Squirrel (voiced with a slight lisp by Mel Blanc) serves as a secret agent, taking orders from his superior, Double-Q (voiced by Paul Frees), of the International Sneaky Service. His designation is Agent 000. Secret Squirrel is assisted in his adventures by his fez-wearing, bespectacled sidekick Morocco Mole (also voiced by Paul Frees impersonating Peter Lorre).

The pair fights crime and evil enemy agents using cunning and a variety of spy gadgets, including a machine gun cane, a collection of weapons kept inside Secret's trench coat which is also bulletproof, and a variety of devices concealed in his purple fedora (which has eye holes cut in it and which he seldom removes).

Secret's recurring archenemy is Yellow Pinkie (also voiced by Frees), a parody of both Auric Goldfinger from Goldfinger and of Sydney Greenstreet's portrayal of the Kasper Gutman character from Dashiell Hammett's The Maltese Falcon. He also tangles with such enemies as the Masked Granny, Captain Kidd and Robin Hood and his Merry Mugs. The last three episodes introduced Hi-Spy (again voiced by Frees), a master of scientific criminology.

Super Secret Secret Squirrel
The 1993 reboot segments saw several changes in characters and artwork compared to the 1960s original cartoons, including the recasting of Jess Harnell as Secret and Jim Cummings as Morocco. All the characters inhabiting the world are now animals (except for a gingerbread man and a Quark). Double-Q (voiced by Tony Jay), now simply called "the Chief" in these shorts, is a Cape buffalo with a sour cherry-scented calabash pipe. Yellow Pinkie has been replaced by a sea lion named Goldflipper (voiced by Jim Cummings) who, despite being Secret's archenemy, only appears in one episode of the revival series. These new cartoons also introduce Penny (voiced by Kimmy Robertson), a female squirrel assistant to the Chief (à la Miss Moneypenny) and a possible love interest for Secret (as hinted at in the episodes "Queen Bea" and "Quark").

Secret's art design remains relatively intact, but looks more modern than the original 1960s version of the character, featuring hard lines and sharper angles, giving him a leaner and more slick style. His trademark hat looks slightly different. Secret also loses his signature lisp given to him by Blanc that was similar to that of Sylvester from the Looney Tunes and Merrie Melodies cartoons from Warner Bros. (although it was paid homage to in the episode "Goldflipper", where Secret spoke with it to mock Morocco's sudden lisp in that episode). Harnell's portrayal gives Secret a suave voice in reminiscence of him sometimes breaking into his Wakko Warner voice without the Scouse accent, most notably when he is screaming.

Morocco's color scheme has been redesigned, his wardrobe's palette has been swapped and he wears sunglasses. Cummings' portrayal of Morocco makes his voice less of a Peter Lorre impersonation: the Moroccan accent remains, but the voice is higher-pitched. He also now has an evil twin brother named Scirocco Mole (voiced by Jess Harnell).

Apparently, in the 1993 revival cartoons, the personalities and traits of Secret and Morocco have been switched as opposed to their original 1960s personalities. Morocco was more of a chauffeur and used to be quite intelligent, while in the revival cartoons he is more independent as a sidekick, becomes more of a bungler, and is more childlike, often getting injured (which was Secret's department in the 1960s series) and often using his catchphrase "Okay, Secret!". Secret was portrayed as a bumbling secret agent in the original, while in the revival version he is actually capable of doing his job right. He can be both a workaholic and more easygoing while still able to get the job done. Like the original, Secret has a gadget for almost everything but also relies on his mixed martial arts combat skills. Most of his injuries either come from his job or Morocco's bumbling.

The Chief speaks with a British accent now (due to being voiced by Tony Jay), as evidenced by his catchphrase "Good show, Secret".

Broadcast history
The series' debut was on September 12, 1965, in The World of Atom Ant and Secret Squirrel prime-time special on NBC.

The original series, The Atom Ant/Secret Squirrel Show, was broadcast from October 2, 1965, to September 2, 1967. Secret Squirrel had his own show in 1966 and was then reunited with Atom Ant in 1967-1968. Episodes were broadcast in syndication and as part of The Banana Splits variety and compilation series.

Super Secret Secret Squirrel
Secret Squirrel and Morocco Mole were revived in 1993 for back-up segments of the first season of TBS Superstation's animated series 2 Stupid Dogs. Titled Super Secret Secret Squirrel, these new cartoons featured Secret Squirrel (voiced by Jess Harnell) and Morocco Mole (voiced by Jim Cummings). 2 Stupid Dogs creator Donovan Cook was asked by then-new Hanna-Barbera president Fred Seibert to choose a classic studio cartoon to revive within the main show, and Super Secret Secret Squirrel was the result. The reason to revive Secret Squirrel was because it was one of Cook's favorite Hanna-Barbera shows.

After Cook guided the updated design with artists Paul Rudish and Craig McCracken, supervising producer Larry Huber, the "adult supervision" assigned by Seibert, was responsible for all further aspects of these cartoons. He assigned animator David Feiss to the storyboards.

This new series seems to have fallen under the villain of the week formula. Except for "Egg" and "Agent Penny", every episode is named after the enemies Secret and Morocco encounter.

Secret and Morocco make an appearance in a 2 Stupid Dogs episode titled "Let's Make a Right Price", in which they star in a commercial for Granny's Joybone Doggie Treats. The Little Dog and the Big Dog from 2 Stupid Dogs appear in the Super Secret Secret Squirrel episode "Scirocco Mole" as contestants in a game show.

Voices
 Mel Blanc as Secret Squirrel (original series)
 Paul Frees as Morocco Mole, Double-Q, Yellow Pinkie, Hi-Spy (original series)
 Jim Cummings as Morocco Mole, Goldflipper (Super Secret Secret Squirrel)
 Jess Harnell as Secret Squirrel, Scirocco Mole (Super Secret Secret Squirrel)
 Tony Jay as Double-Q/the Chief (Super Secret Secret Squirrel)
 Kimmy Robertson as Penny (Super Secret Secret Squirrel)

Production credits
Produced and Directed by: William Hanna and Joseph Barbera
Story: Tony Benedict, Warren Foster, Dalton Sandifer, Michael Maltese
Musical Direction: Ted Nichols
Story Direction: Alex Lovy, Lewis Marshall, Paul Sommer, Art Scott, Steve Clark, Art Davis
Voices: Mel Blanc, Paul Frees, John Stephenson, Jean Vander Pyl, Henry Corden, Don Messick, Allan Melvin, Howard Morris, Janet Waldo, Dick Beals, Gerry Johnson
Animation Direction: Charles A. Nichols
Production Supervision: Howard Hanson
Animation: Ray Abrams, Ed Barge, Robert Bemiller, O.E. "Lefty" Callahan, Emil Carle, Hugh Fraser, George Germanetti, George Goepper, Anatole Kirsanoff, Hicks Lokey, Kenneth Muse, George Nicholas, Don Schloat, Larry Silverman, Ralph Somerville, John Sparey
Layout: Cornelius "Corny" Cole, Jerry Eisenberg, Jack Huber, Lance Nolley, Bill Perez, Tony Sgroi, Bob Singer, Iwao Takamoto
Background: Fernando Arce, Ron Dias, Rene Garcia, Bob Gentle, F. Montealegre, Richard H. Thomas
Camera: Gary Milton, Roger Sims, Clarence Wogatzke, Norman Stainback, John Pratt, John Aardal
Sound Direction: Richard Olson, William Getty
 Secret Squirrel
Approved MPAA Certification No. 21205
RCA Sound Recording
This Picture Made Under the Jurisdiction of IATSE-IA Affiliated with A.F.L.-C.I.O.
A Hanna-Barbera Production

Episodes

Other appearances
 Secret Squirrel appears as a child on Yo Yogi!, voiced by Kath Soucie. He has an uncle named Uncle Undercover (voiced by Greg Burson) who owns the Invention Dimension store in Jellystone Mall.
 Both the original and reboot versions appeared in DC Comics Cartoon Network Presents.
 Secret Squirrel and Morocco Mole appear in Harvey Birdman, Attorney at Law with Secret Squirrel voiced by Bill Farmer and Morocco Mole voiced by Maurice LaMarche. Secret Squirrel first appears in the Season 2 episode "Blackwatch Plaid" as a client of Harvey's arrested for flashing people (a play on Secret's famous trench coat). Secret Squirrel then appeared again in the Season 3 episode "Bird Girl of Guantanamole", hiring Harvey to get Morocco Mole out of the Guantanamo Bay detention camp. Secret Squirrel also has a brief cameo in the series finale "The Death of Harvey".
 Secret Squirrel appeared in the DC Comics book Scooby-Doo! Team-Up #11 in September 2015.
 A "rebooted" version of Secret Squirrel and Morocco Mole was a back-up feature of the DC comic book series Scooby Apocalypse in issues #16-29.
 Secret Squirrel and Morocco Mole made appearances in Jellystone! with Morocco Mole voiced by Dana Snyder. In the season 2 episode "It's a Mad Mad Mad Rat Race", Secret Squirrel is seen on a movie poster for a film called "The Blowening" and Morocco Mole runs a sauna-themed restaurant called "Saunas, Sweats & Sandwiches" in response to the fact that people can't eat sandwiches in a sauna.

LP album
Hanna-Barbera Records released an LP album called Secret Squirrel and Morocco Mole in Super Spy (HLP-2046) in 1966. It featured an adventure with four songs - "Secret Squirrel" (based on the show's theme song) and "Morocco Mole" on the beginning and the end of Side 1, respectively, and "Agent O Double O" and "Super Spy" on the beginning and the end of Side 2, respectively. Mel Blanc reprised his role as Secret Squirrel, but Daws Butler voiced Morocco Mole instead of Paul Frees.

Home video
The episode "Sub Swiper" is available on the DVD Saturday Morning Cartoons 1960s Vol. 1, as well as a part of the "A Sample of Boomerang" tape, from Cartoon Network's sister channel, Boomerang.

Warner Archive released The Secret Squirrel Show: The Complete Series on DVD in Region 1 as part of their Hanna–Barbera Classics Collection in November 2015. This is a Manufacture-on-Demand (MOD) release, available exclusively through Warner's online store and Amazon.com.

The Secret Squirrel Show: The Complete Series was made available for download via iTunes in August 2016.

Warner Archive released 2 Stupid Dogs/Secret Squirrel Show Volume 1 on DVD in August 2018, which includes all of the first-season episodes of 2 Stupid Dogs and all of the episodes of Super Secret Secret Squirrel. Again, this is a Manufacture-on-Demand (MOD) release, available exclusively through Warner's online store and Amazon.com.

Cultural influence
The phrase "Secret Squirrel stuff" is used by people working in U.S. intelligence to lightheartedly describe material that is highly classified, usually as a non-answer to a question. It may likewise be used in a pejorative manner to mean someone who is unlikely to have actually had a job as a special operations soldier, spy or mercenary, or to have performed the actions they claim to.

The history of the name "Secret Squirrel" for special operations forces and spies appears to predate the television show, as one story states that the word "squirrel" was used during World War II as a test to root out German spies.

The name "Secret Squirrel" is police slang for an agent of the United States Secret Service.

The 1990s alternative rock band Marcy Playground recorded a song as an homage called "Secret Squirrel" on their album Shapeshifter.

See also
 List of works produced by Hanna-Barbera Productions
 List of Hanna-Barbera characters
 , also known as Operation Secret Squirrel

References

External links
 Secret Squirrel at Don Markstein's Toonopedia. Archived from the original on May 19, 2017.
 Secret Squirrel
 Detailed listing of each Secret Squirrel (1965–66) episode at the Big Cartoon DataBase
 Informational profile on Secret Squirrel at The Cartoon Scrapbook

1960s American animated television series
1965 American television series debuts
1966 American television series endings
American children's animated action television series
American children's animated adventure television series
American children's animated comedy television series
American detective television series
Animated television series about squirrels
English-language television shows
Fictional secret agents and spies
Hanna-Barbera characters
NBC original programming
Television series by Hanna-Barbera
Television series by Screen Gems
Male characters in animation
Fictional gentleman detectives